Tullus Hostilius (r. 672–640 BC) was the legendary third king of Rome. He succeeded Numa Pompilius and was succeeded by Ancus Marcius. Unlike his predecessor, Tullus was known as a warlike king  who according to the Roman Historian Livy, believed the more peaceful nature of his predecessor had weakened Rome.   It has been attested that he sought out war and was even more warlike than the first king of Rome, Romulus. Accounts of the death of Tullus Hostillus vary. In the mythological version of events Livy describes, he had angered Jupiter who then killed him with a bolt of lightning. Non mythological sources on the other hand describe that he died of plague after a rule of 32 years.

Tullus Hostilius was the grandson of Hostus Hostilius, who had fought with Romulus and died during the Sabine invasion of Rome.

The principal feature of Tullus' reign was the defeat of Alba Longa. After  Alba Longa was beaten (by the victory of three Roman champions over three Albans), Alba Longa became Rome's vassal state. Hostilius during his reign created the college of the Fetiales that concluded all treaties in the name of Rome.

Historical Events
Two distinctive events are traditionally ascribed to Tullus's reign. Historians regard the events as having taken place during the early regal period, but the question of whether the events should be directly associated with Tullus is debatable.

The first event is the destruction of Alba Longa. The historical record shows that the Alban Hills were the site of a large settlement and that this settlement fell under Roman power during the regal period. Details are uncertain about when and by whom Alba Longa was destroyed. It was almost certainly subjugated at a later date than that given by Livy and it may have been destroyed by the Latins and not by the Romans (who might have regarded the destruction of their own traditional mother-country as impious).

The Battle of Alba Longa 
The battle for Alba Longa was settled by having two rare set of triplets that were born both to the cities of Alba Longa and Rome battle in mortal combat for the honor of their city. The last person standing alive would be the winner, and his city would win the war without having their armies engage in battle.  The story states that these triplets were singled out as champions of both cities. According to Livy, it is generally believed that the triplets were named Horatii and Curiatii but it is not known which belonged to which side. However his account does say that the majority believed that the Horatii belonged to Rome, and the Curiatii, Alba Longa. After battling a long time, the last Roman brother emerged as victor, thus Rome and Tullus Hostilius won the battle for Alba Longa.

The Alban dictator Mettius Fufetius betrayed Rome during the war with the Etruscans, where Rome requested Alban military assistance, which Mettius agreed to, but also had a secret agreement with the Etruscans to desert Rome in the heat of battle, leaving Tullus alone to fight the battle. Mettius also betrayed the Etruscans by not joining in the battle at all.  Tullus won the battle despite the betrayal.  Mettius was taken prisoner by Tullus.

Tullus ordered Alba Longa to be destroyed and forced the migration of the Alban citizenry to Rome, where they were integrated and became Roman citizens. For the betrayal of Rome, Tullus had Mettius Fufetius tied between two chariots to be drawn; the horses ripped Mettius Fufetius into two pieces.  Per Jaclyn Neel, this was the first and last time the Romans used this method of execution.

The Construction of the Curia Hostilia 
Tullus's second alleged historical accomplishment was the construction of the original Roman Senate House, the Curia Hostilia.  After the incorporation of leaders from Alba Longa into the senate, it became necessary to erect a new building to accommodate the now much bigger Roman Senate. Thus the Curia Hostilla was built. It was universally held by tradition to have been built by—and named in honor of—Tullus, and its remains on the northwestern edge of the Forum have been dated to around 600 BC. Although that date falls well outside the traditionally-ascribed period of  Tullus Hostilius' reign, scholars are dubious regarding the tales of the overly-long reigns of the Roman kings—with an average reign of 34 years-per-king, the traditional chronology would be without historical parallel (the royal rulers of the remarkably stable and healthy English monarchy have an average reign of 21 years each). Recent archaeological research supports historian Tim Cornell's proposal of a more-plausible chronology which contracts the regal period from 240 years to around 120 years. This places the historical accomplishments of the kings between 625 BC—the date that the archaeological record shows the first signs of Rome's urbanisation and unification—and 500 BC. Using this timeframe, the construction of the Curia Hostilia is possible during the reign of Tullus Hostilius. It would also explain things which are otherwise puzzling: Tullus's name being attached to the building, and how, as Roman traditions attest, Tullus could have led Rome's successful wars against the Fidenae and Veii and the Sabines.

Myth 

As with those of all the early kings of Rome, the events ascribed to the reign of Tullus Hostilius are treated with scepticism by modern historians. Part of this is due to obvious flaws in the literary tradition describing the kings: much like the confusion the Ancients exhibited in attributing identical accomplishments to both Tarquinius Priscus and Tarquinius Superbus, the accomplishments of Tullus Hostilius are thought by many scholars to be rhetorical doublet of those of Romulus. Both are brought up among shepherds, carry on war against Fidenae and Veii, double the number of citizens, and organize the army. Additionally, Tullus Hostilius' warlike and ferocious character seems to be little more than a contrasting stereotype to that of the peaceable, devout Numa Pompilius; the first Roman annalists may merely have imputed aggressive qualities to Hostilius by naively parsing his gentile name (Hostilius meaning "hostile" in Latin).

Hostilius was probably a historical figure, however, in the strict sense that a man bearing the name Tullus Hostilius likely reigned as king in Rome. The most compelling evidence is his name: "Tullus" is a unique praenomen in Roman culture, and his gentile name is obscure and linguistically archaic enough to rule out the possibility that he was a crude later invention.

Death of Tullus Hostilius 
According to Livy, Tullus paid little heed to religious observances during his reign, thinking them unworthy of a king's attention.  However, at the close of his reign, Rome was affected by a series of prophecies including a shower of stones on the Alban Mount (in response to which a public religious festival of nine days was held – a novendialis), a loud voice was heard on the summit of the mount complaining that the Albans had failed to show devotion to their former gods, and a pestilence struck in Rome. King Tullus became ill and was filled with superstition. He reviewed the commentaries of Numa Pompilius and attempted to carry out sacrifices recommended by him.  However, Tullus did not undertake the ceremony to Jupiter Elicius correctly, and both he and his house were struck by lightning and reduced to ashes as a result of the anger of Jupiter.

There are two stories concerning the death of Tullus Hostilius and his family. The first is that his house was hit by lightning and burned to the ground with no survivors. The second is that Ancus Marcius and some of his followers went to Tullus Hostilius's home with swords hidden under their robes. Once inside the home, the party killed Tullus, his family, and their servants and razed the property to ensure there would be no heir to the throne.

In fiction 
Incidents from legends surrounding Tullus Hostilius were used as the basis of opera librettos during the baroque period in music, beginning with a Tullo Ostilio opera performed in Rome in 1694 with music of Giovanni Bononcini. Operatic pastiches with the title Tullo Ostilio performed in Prague in 1727 and Brno in 1735 included music of Antonio Vivaldi. Consistent with contemporary conventions, the stories concentrate on concocted love stories involving members of the principal character's family.

Tullus Hostilius was played by Robert Keith in the 1961 film Duel of Champions, which centered around the Horatii.

Tullus is briefly mentioned in the Aeneid in the description of Aeneas' shield. He is described as hauling away the remains of the liar Mettius through the brush.

He is a character in Philip José Farmer's novel To Your Scattered Bodies Go, the first of the Riverworld series. After the Resurrection, he has teamed up with Hermann Göring to run a slave state.

See also
 Hostilia gens

References

Year of birth unknown
642 BC deaths
7th-century BC Romans
7th-century BC monarchs
Kings of Rome
Hostilii
Characters in Book VI of the Aeneid